Fun in Space is the debut solo album by English musician Roger Taylor, the drummer of Queen. It was released on 6 April 1981 in the UK and 9 May in the US. The album peaked at number 18 in the British charts, while it performed poorly in the US.

The album was recorded in between legs of Queen's tours for The Game and Flash Gordon albums. Taylor wrote, produced, sang and performed all of the songs himself.

The album's credits state "P.P.S. 157 synthesizers", a joke referring to Queen's usual statement of "No synthesizers" in the liner notes of all albums up to The Game.

"Future Management" was issued as a single in Europe, while "Let's Get Crazy" was released in the US. The album was re-released as a digitally remastered CD in 1996.

Cover
The original cover art was created by American artist Jim Laurier. The piece was commissioned for the July 1980 issue of Creepy magazine. The back cover of the album shows Roger Taylor reading that issue.

The 'alien' writing on the magazine on the front cover consists mainly of upside down Hebrew characters. The actual words are meaningless.

Coincidentally, the alien on the cover art was designed by Roger Taylor's former Smile band mate Tim Staffell. The alien was commissioned by Jim Laurier and Tim Staffell wasn't aware of the album cover until he found his alien on Roger Taylor's mantlepiece when visiting his home.

Track listing
 

 Sides one and two were combined as tracks 1–10 on CD reissues.

Personnel
Roger Taylor – drums, percussion, lead and backing vocals, guitars, bass guitar, keyboards
David Richards – engineer, approximately 50% of keyboards
Hipgnosis – artwork, cover design

Singles
 Future Management
A-Side: "Future Management"  B-Side: "Laugh Or Cry"  Released on 30 March 1981.  Reached #49 in the UK Singles Chart.  Released in the UK, Germany, The Netherlands, Italy, Spain, Portugal, Brazil and Ireland.

 Let's Get Crazy
A-Side: "Let's Get Crazy"  B-Side: "Laugh Or Cry"  Released on 15 May 1981.  Released in Japan, USA, Canada and Australia.

 My Country
A-Side: "My Country"  B-Side: "Fun In Space"  Released on 29 June 1981.  Did not chart.  Only released in the UK.

Charts

References

Roger Taylor (Queen drummer) albums
Albums with cover art by Hipgnosis
1981 debut albums
Hard rock albums by British artists
Parlophone albums
EMI Records albums
Elektra Records albums
Albums produced by Roger Taylor (Queen drummer)